John 19 is the nineteenth chapter of the Gospel of John in the New Testament of the Christian Bible. The book containing this chapter is anonymous, but early Christian tradition uniformly affirmed that John composed this Gospel. This chapter records the events on the day of the crucifixion of Jesus, until his burial.

Text

The original text was written in Koine Greek. This chapter is divided into 42 verses.

Textual witnesses
Some early manuscripts containing the text of this chapter are:
Papyrus 90 (AD 150–175; extant verses 1–7)
Papyrus 66 (c. 200; complete)
Papyrus 121 (3rd century; extant verses 17–18,25-26)
Codex Vaticanus (325-350)
Codex Sinaiticus (330-360)
Codex Bezae (c. 400)
Codex Alexandrinus (400-440)
Papyrus 60 (c. 700; extant verses 1-26)

Old Testament references
 : Psalm 
 : Psalm 
 : ; ; Psalm 
 : Zechariah 12:10

New Testament references
: ;  
: ; ; 
: ; ;

Places 
The events recorded in this chapter took place in Jerusalem.

Structure
Swedish-based commentator René Kieffer divides this chapter into two sections:
Verses 1-16a deal with Jesus' trial before Pilate, and are continuous with the events reported in the latter part of chapter 18
Verses 16b-42 deal with his crucifixion, death and burial.
He further divides the first section into four parts: verses 1-3 (humiliation before Pilate), verses 4-7 (Pilate come out of his headquarters with the mocked royal Jesus), verses 8-11 (Jesus' dialogue with Pilate) and verses 12-16a (the "decisive scene" determining Jesus' fate). Kieffer goes on to divide the second section into three parts: a narrative in verses 16b-30 leading to the death of Jesus, a theological commentary in verses 31-37, and a narrative concerning Jesus' burial in verses 38-42.

Verses 1-3: Humiliation before Pilate

Verse 1
So then Pilate took Jesus and scourged [Him].
Heinrich Meyer notes that Pilate "caused the scourging to be carried out", but this would have been done by his soldiers. The action was "inflicted without sentence [or] legality". According to Scottish Free Church minister William Nicoll, the scourging was meant as a compromise by Pilate, undertaken "in the ill-judged hope that this minor punishment might satisfy the Jews". Pilate went on to declare that he found no fault in Jesus (verses 4 and 6).

Verse 2
And the soldiers twisted a crown of thorns and put it on His head, and they put on Him a purple robe.
Again, Meyer notes that this contumelious action of the soldiers was undertaken under Pilate's watch.

Verse 3
Then they said, “Hail, King of the Jews!” And they struck Him with their hands.
In the New Century Version, "they came to him many times and said ...". This additional wording reflects the insertion ἤρχοντο πρὸς αὐτὸν (ērchonto pros auton) in many early texts, but which was missing in the Textus Receptus. Karl Lachmann, Constantin von Tischendorf, Meyer and Westcott and Hort all adopt the additional wording.

Cross references: , ; ; .

Verse 5
Then Jesus came out, wearing the crown of thorns and the purple robe. And Pilate said to them, "Behold the Man!"
"Behold the Man": Ecce homo in Vulgate Latin; in the original , (Ide ho anthrōpos). Meyer reflects that the words are "short [but] significant".

Verse 6
Therefore, when the chief priests and officers saw Him, they cried out, saying, "Crucify Him, crucify Him!" Pilate said to them, "You take Him and crucify Him, for I find no fault in Him".
The Jews did not possess the right of execution, nor was crucifixion a Jewish form of capital punishment.
"No fault": or no crime (Revised Standard Version).

Verse 7The Jews answered him, "We have a law, and according to our law He ought to die, because He made Himself the Son of God."Critical texts refer to "the law", κατὰ τὸν νόμον (kata ton nomon), but the Textus Receptus reads "according to our law". Alfred Plummer, in the Cambridge Bible for Schools and Colleges, argues that "our" is not original.

 ("the law") states:And whoever blasphemes the name of the Lord shall surely be put to death. All the congregation shall certainly stone him, the stranger as well as him who is born in the land. When he blasphemes the name of the Lord, he shall be put to death. 
Pilate was bound by Roman precedent to pay respect to the law of subject nationalities.

Verse 9[Pilate] went again into the Praetorium, and said to Jesus, "Where are You from?" But Jesus gave him no answer.
A second private examination by Pilate.

Verse 19

 Now Pilate wrote a title and put it on the cross. And the writing was:
 JESUS OF NAZARETH, THE KING OF THE JEWS.

Verse 19 in Greek
Textus Receptus/Majority Text:
 ἔγραψεν δὲ καὶ τίτλον ὁ Πιλάτος, καὶ ἔθηκεν ἐπὶ τοῦ σταυροῦ· ἦν δὲ γεγραμμένον,
 Ἰησοῦς ὁ Ναζωραῖος ὁ βασιλεὺς τῶν Ἰουδαίων.
Transliteration:
 egrapsen de kai titlon ho Pilatos, kai ethēken epi tou staurou; ēn de gegrammenon,
 IĒSOUS O NAZŌRAIOS O BASILEUS TŌN IOUDAIŌN.

Verse 19 in Latin
Biblia Sacra Vulgata:
 scripsit autem et titulum Pilatus et posuit super crucem erat autem scriptum
 Iesus Nazarenus rex Iudaeorum

Verse 20
 Then many of the Jews read this title, for the place where Jesus was crucified was near the city; and it was written in Hebrew, Greek, and Latin.

Verse 21
 Therefore the chief priests of the Jews said to Pilate, "Do not write, 'The King of the Jews,' but, 'He said, "I am the King of the Jews."'"

Verse 22

 Pilate answered, "What I have written, I have written."

Verse 22 in Greek
Textus Receptus/Majority Text:
 ἀπεκρίθη ὁ Πιλάτος, Ὃ γέγραφα, γέγραφα
Transliteration:
 apekrithē o Pilatos o gegrapha gegrapha

Verse 22 in Latin
Biblia Sacra Vulgata:
 respondit Pilatus quod scripsi scripsi

Verse 23
 Then the soldiers, when they had crucified Jesus, took His garments and made four parts, to each soldier a part, and also the tunic.
 Now the tunic was without seam, woven from the top in one piece.

Verse 24
 They said therefore among themselves, "Let us not tear it, but cast lots for it, whose it shall be,"
 that the Scripture might be fulfilled which says:
 "They divided My garments among them,
 And for My clothing they cast lots."
 Therefore the soldiers did these things.
Citing:

Verse 25
 Now there stood by the cross of Jesus
 His mother,
 and His mother’s sister, Mary the wife of Clopas, and
 Mary Magdalene.

Verse 26
 When Jesus therefore saw His mother, and the disciple whom He loved standing by,
 He said to His mother,
 "Woman, behold your son!"

Verse 27
 Then He said to the disciple,
 “Behold your mother!”
 And from that hour that disciple took her to his own home.
"That hour" may indicate that "they did not wait at the cross to see the end and the disciple took her to his own home"; εἰς τὰ ἴδια, see , . Mary would live with John and his natural mother, Salome, who is also Mary's sister.

Verse 28

 After this, Jesus, knowing that all things were now accomplished, that the Scripture might be fulfilled, said,
 “I thirst!”
Referring to:

Verse 29
 Now a vessel full of sour wine was sitting there; and they filled a sponge with sour wine,
 put it on hyssop, and put it to His mouth.
 Referring to: 
 Cross reference: ; ;

Verse 30

 So when Jesus had received the sour wine, He said,
 “It is finished!”
 And bowing His head, He gave up His spirit.

Verse 30 in Greek
Textus Receptus/Majority Text:
 ὅτε οὖν ἔλαβε τὸ ὄξος ὁ Ἰησοῦς, εἶπε,
 Τετέλεσται·
 καὶ κλίνας τὴν κεφαλήν, παρέδωκε τὸ πνεῦμα.
Transliteration:
 ote oun elaben to oxos o Iēsous eipen
 tetelestai
 kai klinas tēn kephalēn paredōken to pneuma

Verse 30 in Latin
Biblia Sacra Vulgata:
 cum ergo accepisset Iesus acetum dixit
 consummatum est
 et inclinato capite tradidit spiritum

Verse 31 
Therefore, because it was the Preparation Day, that the bodies should not remain on the cross on the Sabbath (for that Sabbath was a high day), the Jews asked Pilate that their legs might be broken, and that they might be taken away.
Preparation Day was the day before the Passover. Verse 42 refers to this day as "the Jews' Preparation Day". Plummer suggests that "the addition of 'the Jews' may point to the time when there was already a Christian ‘preparation-day'".

Verse 37
And again another Scripture says, "They shall look on Him whom they pierced".
This is the last of a series of texts, commencing from John 13:18: "that the Scripture may be fulfilled, 'He who eats bread with Me has lifted up his heel against Me', in which the evangelist confirms that the events of the passion fulfill the Old Testament scriptures. The quoted passage is b, "then they will look on Me whom they pierced", with the word "me" changed to "him". Lutheran commentator Johann Bengel argues that John quotes this passage "for the sake of its allusion to the piercing [not for that to the looking]".

Verse 39
And Nicodemus, who at first came to Jesus by night, also came, bringing a mixture of myrrh and aloes, about a hundred pounds.
Bengel notes that Nicodemus, who had shown his faith in dialogue with Jesus in chapter 3, here "manifested [it] by an altogether distinguished work of love".

Verse 40 

Then took they the body of Jesus, and wound it in linen clothes with the spices, as the manner of the Jews is to bury.

See also
 Burial of Jesus
 Crucifixion of Jesus
 Jerusalem
 Jesus Christ
 "Jesus, King of the Jews"
 Joseph of Arimathea
 Longinus
 Nazareth
 Nicodemus
 Pontius Pilate
 Sabbath
 Stephaton
 Related Bible parts: Exodus 12, Numbers 9, Psalm 22, Psalm 34, Psalm 69, Zechariah 12, Matthew 2, Matthew 27, Mark 15, Luke 23, John 3, John 18

References

Bibliography

External links
 King James Bible - Wikisource
English Translation with Parallel Latin Vulgate
Online Bible at GospelHall.org (ESV, KJV, Darby, American Standard Version, Bible in Basic English)
Multiple bible versions at Bible Gateway (NKJV, NIV, NRSV etc.)

 
John 19
Pontius Pilate
Descent from the Cross
Nicodemus
Burial of Jesus